Will Byrne is an activist and entrepreneur. Will was named one of Forbes’s 30 Under 30, and his writing has appeared in Forbes and Fast Company.

Early career 
Byrne worked in journalism at Der Spiegel as well as the American Academy in Berlin, Germany, before joining Barack Obama’s 2008 presidential campaign.

During his work on President Obama's 2008 campaign, Byrne utilized online and offline community organizing tactics. Byrne and his co-founders saw the impact of community organizing in the political sphere. Rather than joining the administration after Obama was elected, Byrne went on to develop these tactics as a social entrepreneur.

Groundswell 
In 2009, Byrne, Max Harper, Marcus Ryan, John Lauer, Kristen Psaki, and Tony Ficarotta co-founded Groundswell after working on President Obama’s 2008 campaign. Groundswell is a non-profit organization based in Washington, D.C. that uses collective buying power to drive positive social change, especially in the clean energy sector. Byrne called this model "civic consumption." Byrne served as CEO until 2014; as of 2022, it is led by Michelle Moore, a former White House official.

Stanford Design School 
In 2015, Byrne joined the Stanford Design School as a Civic Innovation Fellow.

Later Work 
Following Stanford, Byrne served as Senior Director of the Innovation Lab at Human Rights First, and presented about issues of bias, inclusion, and human rights in computer vision and artificial intelligence technology. He also wrote articles on emerging technology, AI, human rights and democracy for Fast Company. As of 2023, he was listed as an affiliated fellow at the Citris Policy Lab, which describes itself as supporting interdisciplinary research and education regarding the role of regulation in promoting innovation.

Honors and awards
Forbes 30 Under 30 Selection; Social Entrepreneurs, Forbes Magazine (December 2012) 
Global Fellow,  Ashoka Innovators for the Public, December 2011 
Global Shaper, World Economic Forum, 2011
Champions of Change, White House Executive Office of the President, 2011 
Young Atlanticist Network, Atlantic Council, January 2014
Cordes Social Entrepreneurship Fellow (Global), 2010
Lisa B. Hall Fellow, Concord Academy, 2013

See also
Social entrepreneurship
List of social entrepreneurs

References 

Date of birth missing (living people)
Living people
American activists
American writers
Social entrepreneurs
Year of birth missing (living people)
Ashoka Fellows
Ashoka USA Fellows